Daniel Kountz (born October 16, 1978) is an American actor and realtor.

Early life
Kountz got his first taste of acting in third grade, when he played "Tiny Tim" in a school play.

Career
Kountz has been on television and in movies. In 1998, he played Ray "The Hood" Wood in Fifteen and Pregnant, where he acted alongside Kirsten Dunst. In 2001, he played his most notable character to date, Kal in Halloweentown II: Kalabar's Revenge, where he acted alongside Kimberly J. Brown. In a 2020 question-and-answer panel, Kountz revealed he had four of five auditions for the film before being cast. He also was in an episode of Ghost Whisperer, titled Ghost in the Machine, as the avatar. He has also had parts in Just Shoot Me, 3rd Rock from the Sun, Crossing Jordan, and a few others. He's now a real estate agent in Los Angeles.

Personal life
Kountz has been dating his Halloweentown II costar Kimberly J. Brown after reconnecting for a "Halloweentown"-themed project for Brown's YouTube channel. In June 2022, Brown announced their engagement on social media. He currently resides in Los Angeles, California.

Filmography

Film

Television

Video games

References

External links

American male film actors
American male television actors
Living people
Male actors from Los Angeles
American real estate brokers
1978 births